Rupert Grant (born November 5, 1973 in Washington, D.C., United States ) is a former Arena Football League fullback/linebacker most recently with the now defunct Nashville Kats.  His nickname is "Dogghead".  During his time in the AFL, Grant has also played for the Detroit Fury and Orlando Predators.  He was originally signed by the New England Patriots of the National Football League as an undrafted free agent out of Howard University in 1995. He was named Second-team All-Arena in 2001 and 2004.

External links
NFL stats from NFL.com
AFL stats from arenafan.com

1973 births
Living people
Players of American football from Washington, D.C.
American football linebackers
American football running backs
Howard Bison football players
New England Patriots players
Nashville Kats players
Detroit Fury players
Orlando Predators players